Halal Daddy is a 2017 Irish-German-French comedy film featuring Sarah Bolger, Colm Meaney, David Kross and Art Malik.

Plot
Raghdan Aziz, a young British-Indian Muslim man, has moved out of his strict parents' home in Bradford, England to live with his aunt and uncle in Sligo, Ireland. He enjoys spending time with his girlfriend Maeve and his two best friends Derek and Omar. Then his father Amir arrives, with a plan to turn a local abattoir into a halal butcher's shop.

Cast
Nikesh Patel as Raghdan Aziz
Sarah Bolger as Maeve Logan
Colm Meaney as Martin Logan
Art Malik as Amir Aziz
David Kross as Jasper
Jerry Iwu as Neville
Paul Tylak as Jamal Aziz
Deirdre O'Kane as Doreen Murphy
Stephen Cromwell as Derek
Mark O'Halloran as Omar

Reception
The film has a 43% approval rating on Rotten Tomatoes based on seven reviews, with an average rating of 6/10.  Paul Whitington of the Irish Independent awarded the film two stars.  Hilary A. White of the Sunday Independent awarded it three stars.  Sarah McIntyre of RTÉ.ie gave the film four stars out of five.  Donald Clarke of The Irish Times gave it three stars out of five.

References

External links
 
 

English-language French films
English-language Irish films
English-language German films
French comedy films
Irish comedy films
German comedy films
2017 comedy films
2010s English-language films
2010s French films
2010s German films